Elvio Banchero (28 April 1904 – 21 January 1982) was an Italian footballer who played as a striker. He competed in the 1928 Summer Olympics with the Italy national football team, winning a bronze medal.

Club career
Banchero was born in Alessandria. He played for seven seasons (120 games, 48 goals) in the Italian Serie A for Genova 1893, A.S. Roma, A.S. Bari and U.S. Alessandria Calcio 1912.

International career
Banchero was a member of the Italy national team which won the bronze medal in the football tournament at the 1928 Summer Olympics. He scored a hat trick (3 goals) in the 11–3 victory against Egypt, that led to the Bronze medal. He also started in the first match of the 1931-32 Central European International Cup silver winning campaign.

Personal life
Elvio's younger brother Ettore Banchero played football professionally as well. To distinguish them, Elvio was referred to as Banchero I and Ettore as Banchero II.

Honours

International 
Italy
 Central European International Cup: Runner-up: 1931-32
 Summer Olympics: Bronze 1928

References

External links
profile
 
 
 
 

1904 births
1982 deaths
Association football forwards
Italian footballers
Footballers at the 1928 Summer Olympics
Olympic footballers of Italy
Olympic bronze medalists for Italy
Italy international footballers
Serie A players
Serie B players
U.S. Alessandria Calcio 1912 players
S.P.A.L. players
Genoa C.F.C. players
A.S. Roma players
S.S.C. Bari players
Parma Calcio 1913 players
Italian football managers
U.S. Alessandria Calcio 1912 managers
Olympic medalists in football
Medalists at the 1928 Summer Olympics